Dilwaala is a 1986 Indian Hindi-language film directed by K. Murali Mohana Rao, starring Mithun Chakraborty, Meenakshi Sheshadri, Smita Patil in lead roles. The film was a remake of Telugu film Kathanayakudu (1984).

Plot
Ravi (Mithun Chakraborty) and his sister Judge Sumitra Devi (Smita Patil) never see eye to eye. MLA Raj Shekhar's son Raghu (Gulshan Grover) marries the poor Kamla (Supriya Pathak) at his father's behest. But not liking her, Raghu tortures and later kills Kamla. The father does his best to get his son out of the hands of law. Watch the drama unfolding in court in the presence of Judge Sumitra Devi and the role played by Ravi.

Soundtrack
Lyrics: Indeevar

Cast
Mithun Chakraborty as Ravi Kumar
Meenakshi Sheshadri as Padma
Smita Patil as Sumitra  
Suresh Oberoi as Madanlal Sharma
Sarika as Sapna 
Arun Govil as Mohan Kumar
Asrani as Sub Inspector Sohan
Aruna Irani as Shanti
Supriya Pathak as Kamla
Gulshan Grover as Raghu
Pran as MLA Raj Shekhar 
Kader Khan as Sewakram Seetapuri 
Shakti Kapoor as King Kong 
Goga Kapoor as King Kong's Brother-in-law
Viju Khote as Grocer
Dulari as Chachi 
Shreeram Lagoo as Ganesh Vithal Kolhapure 
Murad as Judge 
Raza Murad as Public Prosecutor 
Paintal as Narayan
Renu Joshi as Mrs. Savitri Seetapuri 
Bandini Mishra as Champa

References

External links
 
 https://archive.today/20130126003326/http://ibosnetwork.com/asp/filmbodetails.asp?id=Dilwaala
 https://web.archive.org/web/20110906141902/http://www.bollywoodhungama.com/movies/cast/4890/index.html

1986 films
1980s Hindi-language films
Indian action films
Films scored by Bappi Lahiri
Hindi remakes of Telugu films
1986 action films
Hindi-language action films
Suresh Productions films